Khagani Mammadov (born 29 September 1976, Baku) is an Azerbaijani footballer (striker). Mammadov received 20 international caps for the Azerbaijan national football team, scoring one goal.

He scored the most goals in Azerbaijani Premier League with Inter Baku in 2007–08 season.

National team statistics

International goals

Honours

Club

Neftchi Baku
Azerbaijan Premier League: (1) 1995–96
Azerbaijan Cup: (2) 1994–95,1995–96

Shamkir
Azerbaijan Premier League: (2) 2000–01,2001–02
Machine Sazi F.C.

Individual
Azerbaijan Premier League top goalscorer: 2007–08
Machine sazi FC

References

External links
Profile on Inter Baku's Official Site

Armenian Azerbaijanis
1976 births
Living people
Azerbaijani footballers
Azerbaijan international footballers
Azerbaijani expatriate footballers
Association football forwards
Expatriate footballers in Iran
Machine Sazi F.C. players
FC Rostov players
Shamakhi FK players
Khazar Lankaran FK players
Expatriate footballers in Azerbaijan
MOIK Baku players
People from Masis
Neftçi PFK players